Gymnasium (and variations of the word) is a term in various European languages for a secondary school that prepares students for higher education at a university. It is comparable to the  US English term preparatory high school. Before the 20th century, the gymnasium system was a widespread feature of educational systems throughout many European countries.

The word , from Greek  'naked' or 'nude', was first used in Ancient Greece, in the sense of a place for both physical and intellectual education of young men. The latter meaning of a place of intellectual education persisted in many European languages (including Albanian, Bulgarian, Estonian, Greek, German, Hungarian, the Scandinavian languages, Dutch, Polish, Czech, Serbo-Croatian, Macedonian, Slovak, Slovenian and Russian), whereas in other languages, like English (gymnasium, gym) and Spanish (gimnasio), the former meaning of a place for physical education was retained.

School structure
Because gymnasiums prepare students for university study, they are thus meant for the more academically minded students, who are sifted out between the ages of 10 and 13. In addition to the usual curriculum, students of a gymnasium often study Latin and Ancient Greek.

Some gymnasiums provide general education, while others have a specific focus. (This also differs from country to country.) The four traditional branches are:
humanities (specialising in classical languages, such as Latin and Greek)
modern languages (students are required to study at least three languages)
mathematics and physical sciences
economics and other social sciences (students are required to study economics, world history, social studies or business informatics)

Curricula differ from school to school but generally include literature, mathematics, informatics, physics, chemistry, biology, geography, art (as well as crafts and design), music, history, philosophy, civics/citizenship, social sciences, and several foreign languages.

Schools concentrate not only on academic subjects, but also on producing well-rounded individuals, so physical education and religion or ethics are compulsory, even in non-denominational schools which are prevalent. For example, the German constitution guarantees the separation of church and state, so although religion or ethics classes are compulsory, students may choose to study a specific religion or none at all.

Today, a number of other areas of specialization exist, such as gymnasiums specializing in economics, technology or domestic sciences. Here, the prefix pro- is equivalent to pre-, indicating that this curriculum precedes normal gymnasium studies.

History
In Central European, Nordic, Benelux and Baltic countries, this meaning for "gymnasium" (that is a secondary school preparing the student for higher education at a university) has been the same at least since the Protestant Reformation in the 16th century. The term was derived from the classical Greek word "", which was originally applied to an exercising ground in ancient Athens. Here teachers gathered and gave instruction between the hours devoted to physical exercises and sports, and thus the term became associated with and came to mean an institution of learning.

This use of the term did not prevail among the Romans, but was revived during the Renaissance in Italy, and from there passed into the Netherlands and Germany during the 15th century. In 1538, Johannes Sturm founded at Strasbourg the school which became the model of the modern German gymnasium. In 1812, a Prussian regulation ordered all schools with the right to send their students to the university to bear the name of gymnasium. By the 20th century, this practice was followed in almost the entire Austrian-Hungarian, German, and Russian Empires. In the modern era, many countries which have gymnasiums were once part of these three empires.

By country

Albania
In Albania, a gymnasium education takes three years following a compulsory nine-year elementary education and ending with a final aptitude test called . The final test is standardized at the state level and serves as an entrance qualification for universities.

These can be either public (state-run, tuition-free) or private (fee-paying). The subjects taught are mathematics, Albanian language, one to three foreign languages, history, geography, computer science, the natural sciences (biology, chemistry, physics), history of art, music, philosophy, logic, physical education, and the social sciences (sociology, ethics, psychology, politics and economy).

The gymnasium is generally viewed as a destination for the best-performing students and as the type of school that serves primarily to prepare students for university, while other students go to technical/vocational schools. Therefore, gymnasiums often base their admittance criteria on an entrance exam, elementary school grades, or some combination of the two.

Austria
In Austria the Gymnasium has two stages, from the age of 11 to 14, and from 15 to 18, concluding with Matura. Historically, three types existed. The  focuses on Ancient Greek and Latin. The  puts its focus on actively spoken languages. The usual combination is English, French, and Latin; sometimes French can be swapped with another foreign language (like Italian, Spanish or Russian). The Realgymnasium emphasizes the sciences. In the last few decades, more autonomy has been granted to schools, and various types have been developed, focusing on sports, music, or economics, for example.

Belarus
In Belarus, gymnasium is the highest variant of secondary education, which provides advanced knowledge in various subjects. 
The number of years of instruction at a gymnasium is 12, which is different from usual secondary education (11 years). However, it is possible to cover all required credits in 11 years, by taking additional subjects each semester.
In Belarus, gymnasium is generally viewed as a destination for the best-performing students and as the type of school that serves primarily to prepare students for university.

Czech Republic and Slovakia

In the Czech Republic and Slovakia,  (also spelled gymnasium) is a type of school that provides secondary education.  leads to the  exam.
There are different types of  distinguished by the length of study. In the Czech Republic there are eight-year, six-year, and four-year types, and in Slovakia there are eight-year and four-year types, of which the latter is more common. In both countries, there are also bilingual (Czech or Slovak with English, French, Spanish, Italian, German, or Russian; in Slovakia, bilingual  are five-year) and private .

Germany

German gymnasiums are selective schools. They offer the most academically promising youngsters a quality education that is free in all state-run schools (and generally not above €50/month cost in Church-run schools, though there are some expensive private schools). Gymnasiums may expel students who academically under-perform their classmates or behave in a way that is often seen as undesirable and unacceptable.

Historically, the German  also included in its overall accelerated curriculum post-secondary education at college level and the degree awarded substituted for the bachelor's degree (Baccalaureate) previously awarded by a college or university so that universities in Germany became exclusively graduate schools. In the United States, the German Gymnasium curriculum was used at a number of prestigious universities, such as the University of Michigan, as a model for their undergraduate college programs.

Pupils study subjects such as German, mathematics, physics, chemistry, geography, biology, arts, music, physical education, religion, history and civics/citizenship/social sciences and computer science. They are also required to study at least two foreign languages. The usual combinations are English and French or English and Latin, although many schools make it possible to combine English with another language, most often Spanish, Ancient Greek, or Russian. Religious education classes are a part of the curricula of all German schools, yet not compulsory; a student or their parents or guardians can conscientiously object to taking them, in which case the student (along with those whose religion is not being taught in the school) is taught ethics or philosophy. In-state schools, a student who is not baptized into either the Catholic or Protestant faiths is allowed to choose which of these classes to take. The only exception to this is in the state of Berlin, where the subject ethics is mandatory for all students and (Christian) religious studies can only be chosen additionally. A similar situation is found in Brandenburg where the subject life skills, ethics, and religious education (Lebensgestaltung, Ethik, Religionskunde, LER) is the primary subject but parents/guardians or students older than 13 can choose to replace it with (Christian) religious studies or take both. The intention behind LER is that students should get an objective insight on questions of personal development and ethics as well as on the major world religions.

For younger students nearly the entire curriculum of a gymnasium is compulsory; in higher years additional subjects are available and some of the hitherto compulsory subjects can be dropped, but the choice is not as wide as in other school systems, such as US high schools.

Although some specialist Gymnasiums have English or French as the language of instruction, at most Gymnasiums lessons (apart from foreign language courses) are conducted in Standard German.

The number of years of instruction at a gymnasium differs between the states. It varies between six and seven years in Berlin and Brandenburg (primary school is six years in both as opposed to four years in the rest of Germany) and eight in Bavaria, Hesse and Baden-Württemberg among others. While in Saxony and Thuringia students have never been taught more than eight years in Gymnasium (by default), nearly all states now conduct the  examinations, which complete the Gymnasium education, after 13 years of primary school and Gymnasium combined. These final examinations are now centrally drafted and controlled in all German states except for Rhineland-Palatinate and provide a qualification to attend any German university.

Italy
In Italy originally the  indicated a typology of five-year junior high school (age 11 to 16) and preparing to the three year Classical Lyceum (age 16 to 19), a high school focusing on classical studies and humanities.

In July 1940 the Fascist Minister of National Education Giuseppe Bottai got a bill of law approved that abolished the first three years of the Gymnasium and instituted a unique path of studies for children aged from 12 to 14. The last two years of the Gymnasium kept the previous denomination and the related scholastic curriculum for the following decades.

Netherlands
In the Netherlands, gymnasium is the highest variant of secondary education, offering the academically most promising youngsters (top 5%) a quality education that is in most cases free (and in other cases at low cost). The equivalent without classical languages is called , and gives access to the same university studies (although some extra classes are needed when starting a degree in classical languages or theology). All are government-funded. See  (in English) for the full article on Dutch "preparatory scientific education".

Nordic and Baltic countries

In Denmark, Estonia, the Faroe Islands, Finland, Greenland, Iceland, Latvia, Norway and Sweden, gymnasium consists of three years, usually starting at the year the students turn 16 years old after nine or ten years of primary school. In Lithuania the gymnasium usually consists of four years of schooling starting at the age of 15–16, the last year roughly corresponding to the first year of college.

Most gymnasiums in the Nordic countries are free. Universal student grants are also available in certain countries for students over 18.

In Denmark (see also Gymnasium (Denmark)), there are four kinds of gymnasiums: STX (Regular Examination Programme), HHX (Higher Business Examination Programme), HTX (Higher Technical Examination Programme) and HF (Higher Preparatory Examination Programme). HF is only two years, instead of the three required for STX, HHX, and HTX. All four type of gymnasiums theoretically gives the same eligibility for university. However, because of the different subjects offered, students may be better qualified in an area of further study. E.g. HHX students have subjects that make them more eligible for studies such as business studies or economics at university, while HTX offer applied science and mathematics that benefit studies in Science or Engineering. There is also EUX, which takes four years and ends with both the STX exam and status as a journeyman of a craft. Compared to the somewhat equivalent A-levels in the UK, Danish gymnasia have more mandatory subjects. The subjects are divided into levels, where A-levels run through all three years, B-levels two years and C-levels one year (apart from PE which exists as a C-level lasting tree years).

In Sweden, there are two different kinds of branches of studies: the first branch focuses on giving a vocational education while the second branch focuses on giving preparation for higher education. While students from both branches can go on to study at a university, students of the vocational branch graduate with a degree within their attended program. There are 18 national programs, 12 vocational and 6 preparatory.

In the Faroe Islands, there are also four kinds of gymnasiums, which are the equivalents of the Danish programmes:  (equivalent to STX),  (HHX),  (HTX) and HF (HF).  and HF are usually located at the same institutions as can be seen in the name of the institute in Eysturoy: Studentaskúlin og HF-skeiðið í Eysturoy.

In Greenland, there is a single kind of gymnasium, Den Gymnasiale Uddannelse (Ilinniarnertuunngorniarneq), that replaced the earlier Greenlandic Secondary Education Programme (GU), the Greenland Higher Commercial Examination Programme (HHX) and the Greenland education to Higher Technical Examination Programme (HTX), which were based on the Danish system. This program allows a more flexible Greenland gymnasium, where students based on a common foundation course can choose between different fields of study that meet the individual student's abilities and interests.

In Finland, the admissions to gymnasiums are competitive, the accepted people comprising 51% of the age group. The gymnasiums concludes with the matriculation examination, an exam whose grades are the main criteria for university admissions.

Switzerland
In Switzerland, gymnasia are selective schools that provide a three- to six-year (depending on the canton) course of advanced secondary education intended to prepare students to attend university. The gymnasia are operated by the cantons of Switzerland, and accordingly in many cantons they are called  (cantonal school).

Former Yugoslav countries

In Bosnia and Herzegovina, Croatia, Montenegro, North Macedonia, Serbia, and Slovenia, a gymnasium education takes four years following a compulsory eight or nine-year elementary education and ending with a final aptitude test called Matura. In these countries, the final test is standardized at the state level and can serve as an entrance qualification for universities.

There are either public (state-run and tuition-free), religious (church-run with secular curriculum and tuition-free) or private (fee-paying) gymnasium schools in these countries.

The subjects taught are mathematics, the native language, one to three foreign languages, history, geography, informatics (computers), the natural sciences (biology, chemistry, physics), history of art, music, philosophy, logic, physical education, and the social sciences (sociology, ethics or religious education, psychology, politics, and economy). Religious studies are optional. In Bosnia and Herzegovina, Croatia, Montenegro, Slovenia, Serbia and North Macedonia, Latin is also a mandatory subject in all gymnasiums, just as Ancient Greek is, with Latin, in a certain type of gymnasiums called Classical Gymnasiums.

In all of the countries, the gymnasium (/) is generally viewed as a destination for best-performing students and as the type of school that serves primarily to prepare students for university studies, while other students go to technical/vocational schools. Therefore, gymnasiums often base their admittance criteria on an entrance exam, elementary school grades, or a combination of the two.

Countries with gymnasium systems

: Colegio Nacional de Buenos Aires, 6 years; Rafael Hernández National College of La Plata, 5 years (formerly 6 years), after 7 years of primary school; and Gymnasium UNT 8 years, ends at the age of 18.
: 7 years, after 4 years of primary school.
: 6 years, starting at age 11/13, after 6 years of primary school, ends at the age of 18 where students progress to a university.
: Deutsche Schule Mariscal Braun La Paz, 6 years, ends with Abitur. 
: 4 years, starting at age 14/15 after 9 years in elementary school, ends with Matura
: Humboldt Schule of São Paulo is a German school in São Paulo. There are more Gymnasiums in the country and some of them receive resources from the German government.
: 5 years, after 7 years of primary school. Currently graduation after passing at least two Maturas.
:  ( all-male, traditional Pre-K to 11th grade private school located in Bogotá, Colombia. Its founders were inspired by the original greek to name the first "Gimnasio" in Colombia).
Students of all tracks have compulsory classes in Latin and English as well as in at least one additional foreign language (most commonly German, Italian, Spanish and French).
: 3 years, starting at age 12 and following 6 years of elementary school. Compulsory for all students. Followed by the non-mandatory Lyceum (ages 15 to 18) for students with academic aspirations or Secondary Technical and Vocational Lyceum TVE for students who prefer vocational training. After successfully completing the program, students of TVE are awarded a School Leaving Certificate, which is recognized as equivalent to a Lyceum School Leaving Certificate (three-grade Senior Secondary School). 
: 4 years, starting at age 15 or 16; 6 years, starting at age 13 or 14 (not usual); 8 years, starting at age 11 or 12; all ending in matura.
: 3 years, or 4 years for athletes who are part of the Team Danmark elite sports program, and musicians who have chosen MGK ("Musical Elementary Course"), usually starting after 10 or 11 years of primary school. This is more like a prep school or the first years of college than high school. Everyone is eligible to go to a US high school, but one needs to be deemed competent to get into a gymnasium. (For more information, see Gymnasium (Denmark).)
: 3 years, after 9 years of primary school.
: 3 years, usually starting after 9 or 10 years of primary school. The system is similar to the Danish system.
: formerly 8–9 years depending on the state—now being changed to 8 years nationwide, starting at 5th (at age 11),  in 12th or 13th grade; for more information, see Gymnasium (Germany).
: 3 years, starting at age 12 after 6 years of primary school. Compulsory for all children, it is followed by the non-mandatory , (Lyceum, ages 15–18), or the Vocational Lyceum (EPAL). The EPAL School Leaving Certificate is recognized equally as a Senior Secondary School Leaving Certificate (high school).
: 4/6/8 years, starting after 8/6/4 years of primary school, ends with Matura; see Education in Hungary
: usually 3–4 years, starting at age 15 or 16 after 10 years of elementary school.
: five schools termed "gymnasium" located in Tel Aviv, Rishon LeZion, Jerusalem, and Haifa.
:  is the name of the two first years of 
: 7 years, after 5 years of primary school
: 3 years, after 9 years of primary school
: ends with Matura
: —usually 4 years: 2 years of basic school after 4 years of basic school and 2 years of secondary school, sometimes 8 years: 6 of basic school and 2 of secondary school, 12 years in rural areas or in art/music gymnasiums.
: usually 7 years, starting at age 12–13 after 6 years of primary school.
: 4 years, starting at age 14/15 after 9 years in elementary school,ends with Matura.
: 6 years, starting at age 11–13, after 8 years of primary school. Prepares for admission to university. Gymnasia in the Netherlands have compulsory classes in Ancient Greek and/or Latin; the same high level secondary school without the classical languages is called Atheneum.
This has now been succeeded by a 2-, 3-, or 4-year program, depending on course path taken, starting at the age of 15/16, culminating with an exam that qualifies for university matriculation.
:  was the name of the 3-year Polish compulsory middle school, starting at age of 12 or 13, following 6 years of primary school.  ended with a standardized test. Further education was encouraged but optional, consisting of either 3-year , 4-year , or 2 to 3 years of vocational school (potentially followed by a supplementary  or ). In 2017, Poland reverted to a compulsory 8-year primary school, optionally followed by a 4-year , a 5-year , or 2 to 3 years of vocational school.
Primary education lasts for four years. High school education (lower cycle of high school and upper secondary school education) offers three different orientations (academic, technological, specialization).

Imperial Russia: since 1726, 8 years since 1871. Women's gymnasiums since 1862; 7 years plus an optional 8th for specialisation in pedagogy. Progymnasiums: equivalent to 4 first years of gymnasium.
Russian Federation: full 11 or 6–7 years after primary school. There are very few classical gymnasiums in modern Russia. The notable exception is the St Petersburg Classical Gymnasium where Latin, Ancient Greek, and mathematics are the three core subjects. In the majority of other cases, Russian Gymnasiums are schools specialised in a certain subject (or several subjects) in the humanities (e.g. Chelyabinsk School No. 1).
: 4 years, starting at age 14/15 after 8 years in elementary/primary school. There are three most common types of gymnasiums: 1) general gymnasium which offers broad education in all sciences; 2) natural sciences; and 3) social studies, available all over Serbia, and a few specialised ones, e.g. mathematics—only one in all of Serbia, in Belgrade; sports—just two in Serbia; language—a total of four in Serbia; and military gymnasium—only one in all of Serbia. In the end, all students take a final exam—a Matura. Completion of the Gymnasium is a prerequisite for enrollment into a university. English and another foreign language (from the selection of German, French, Russian (most common languages), Italian or Spanish (far less common) or Chinese and Japanese (only philological gymnasiums have these two) in addition to the mother tongue, and in case of minorities also Serbian) are compulsory throughout.
: 4 years starting at age 15/16 after completing 9 years of elementary school (more common); 8 years starting at age 11/12 after completing 5 years of elementary school; both end with Maturita.
: 4 years, starting at age 14/15; ends with Matura.
: Paul Roos Gymnasium is a well-known gymnasium for boys in the town of Stellenbosch. The school is a boarding school, based on the classic British boarding schools; however, it was more influenced by the Protestant faith, hence the German Gymnasium. Foreign languages such as French, German, Mandarin, and Latin are studied; Afrikaans and English are compulsory. School in South Africa: 5 years, starting at age 13/14, at a secondary institution, after 7 years of primary school, ends with Matric.
: Upper secondary school in Sweden lasts for three years (formerly four years on some programmes). "Gymnasium" is the word used to describe this stage of the education system in Sweden. The National Agency of Education has decided that gymnasium is equivalent to the international upper secondary school. The gymnasium is optional and follows after nine years in elementary school. However, the Swedish term  ("high school") may cause some confusion. In Swedish it is used almost synonymously with "university," with the only difference being that universities have the right to issue doctoral examinations. A  is often located in cities with lower population, except for the technical ones that can be found also in the largest cities. 
: usually 4 years after 9 years of compulsory schooling (primary and secondary I); it is also possible to attend a so-called  which lasts 6 years, following a six-year primary schooling; the Gymnasium ends with Matura at the age of 18/19.
: 8 years, starting after 4 years of primary school.
: historically, grammar schools have been the English equivalent of the gymnasium, selecting pupils on the basis of academic ability (usually through the 11+ entrance examination in year 6, at the age of 10 or 11) and educating them with the assumption that they would go on to study at a university; such schools were largely phased out from 1965 under the Wilson and Heath governments, and less than 5% of pupils now attend the remaining 146 grammar schools. The UK therefore no longer has a widespread equivalent of the gymnasium. The exception is Northern Ireland and some parts of England within the counties of Buckinghamshire, Lincolnshire, and Kent, which have retained the system. Grammar schools are also to be found in some London boroughs, North Yorkshire, Essex, Lancashire, Warwickshire, and Devon in varying degrees. Many private, fee-paying private schools, including all those commonly referred to as "public" schools, seek to fulfill a similar role to the state grammar school if the scholar has the ability (and thus to the gymnasium in other countries) and, most importantly, the money to attend them.

Public school: As school districts continue to experiment with educational styles, the magnet school has become a popular type of high school. Boston Latin School and Central High School in Philadelphia are the two oldest public schools in the country and the oldest magnet schools. As the concept has not become entrenched in the various American educational systems, due partly to the federal—rather than unitary—style of education in the United States, the term may vary among states.
Private school: The equivalent among private schools is the preparatory school.

Final degree
Depending on country, the final degree (if any) is called Abitur, Artium, Diploma, Matura, Maturita or Student and it usually opens the way to professional schools directly. However, these degrees are occasionally not fully accredited internationally, so students wanting to attend a foreign university often have to submit to further exams to be permitted access to them.

Relationship with other education facilities
In countries like Austria, most university faculties only accept students from secondary schools that last four years (rather than three). This includes all Gymnasium students but only a part of vocational high schools, in effect making Gymnasium the preferred choice for all pupils aiming for university diplomas.

These are attended by about two thirds of the students and the first two are practically unknown in other parts of the world. A  largely corresponds to a British or American comprehensive school. Students who graduate from a vocational school and students who graduate with a good grade point average from a  can continue their schooling at another type of German secondary school, the Fachhochschulreife, a vocational high school.

See also

 Comparison of US and UK Education
 Gymnasium (ancient Greece)
 Gymnasium (Germany)
 Lyceum (classical)
 Educational stage
 Realschule
 Lyceum

Explanatory notes

Citations

External links 
 

 
School types
Secondary education